Allawayh al-Asar (or Alluya; flourished ) was a singer of Sogdian origin at the Abbasid court of Harun al-Rashid and his successors. His grandfather, a captive from Sogdia, was a "freedman" (mawla) in Umayyad times. Allawayh al-Asar was a student of Ibrahim al-Mawsili; in contemporaneous sources, he, Ishaq al-Mawsili (son of Ibrahim al-Mawsili) and Mukhariq were often mentioned together. Allawayh was fond of the style introduced by Ibrahim ibn al-Mahdi, and, according to D. M. Dunlop: "Perhaps we are to see in his introduction of Persian elements into the old Arabic music some indication of national preference". However, by the following century, according to the Kitab al-Aghani, the so-called "traditionalist views" of Ishaq al-Mawsili "held the field". Despite his initial allegiance to Ishaq's conservative musical traditions, Allawayh eventually joined the progressive musical faction of Ibrahim ibn al-Mahdi.

References

Sources

External links
 
 

850s deaths
Sogdian people
9th-century people from the Abbasid Caliphate
Courtiers of the Abbasid Caliphate
Singers of the medieval Islamic world
9th-century Iranian people
Year of birth uncertain
Musicians from the Abbasid Caliphate